The use of the Internet in Iceland places Iceland among the top countries in the world in terms of Internet deployment and use. The use of internet in Iceland is widespread. Iceland has been at the forefront of adopting new internet access technologies starting in the early 1990s with dial-up connections. Today, 1Gbit/s speeds are available to 90% of citizens through full-fibre networks. Iceland has 168.2Tb/s of submarine bandwidth capacity through 4 cables.

Iceland is a world leader in fibre internet deployment: 90% of homes in Iceland have access to FTTH (full fibre) internet services, with offered speeds of 1000Mb/s to residential customers. The main access providers are Míla hf, operating the largest national trunk network and GPON fibre (FTTH) network, and Ljósleiðarinn operating a bitsteam access PTP fibre network as well as smaller companies operating locally.

ISNIC is the Icelandic domain registry for its country-code top level domain, .is. It is a member of the RIPE NCC, Europe's regional Internet registry. ISNIC also operate Iceland's only open-policy internet exchange point, the Reykjavík Internet Exchange (RIX).

Broadband internet access gained rapid popularity in Iceland due to the early use of IPTV technologies in the early 2000s. Cable and Satellite TV services are next to nonexistent and therefore the provision of TV through DSL or fiber was in high demand. The majority of connections in Iceland are by fibre or VDSL with Síminn, Vodafone and NOVA being the main providers.

Access technology
In terms of terms of types of connections; fibre (PTP and GPON), VDSL/2, ADSL are the most common types. DSL use peaked in 2008 at 98% of connections, and has been decreasing since as connections are being replaced by fibre. A minority of connections are by provided by fixed wireless in the most remote of locations.

As of 2020:
 68.6% of broadband connections using optical fiber (FTTH).
 30.5% of the broadband access being VDSL (FTTC). 
0.2% of broadband access by ADSL
 0.006% of connections by cable (DOCSIS).
0.002% of access is provided by fixed wireless.

In terms of advertised download speeds:
 58.8% of connections are 500Mbit/s and above
 14.5% of connections are between 100 and 500Mbit/s and above.
 26.7% of connections are between 10 and 100Mbit/s.
 Only 0.2% of connections are below 10Mbit/s.

90% of homes in Iceland have full fibre access, however only 68.6% of connections utilise the fibre connection mainly due to the fact that Síminn, the incumbent telecommunications provider in Iceland, only began to offer services over Ljósleiðarinn's wholesale fibre network since 2021, after a long dispute over fibre access.

Ljósleiðarinn's full fibre network extends to 120.000+ homes Reykjavík and surrounding towns, allowing reaching 100% of homes in Reykjavík and surrounding area in 2016. GR also has 100% fiber coverage in smaller towns such as Reykjanesbær, Akranes, Þorlákshöfn, Hella, Selfoss and Hvolsvöllur, Ljósleiðarinn's network delivers speeds of 1Gbit/s to all customers.

There are other smaller fibre networks run by local municipalities and companies, a major one being Tengir in the north east of Iceland providing a fibre network to Akureyri and surrounding regions offering up to 1Gbit/s speeds.

The government has engaged in a programme called Ísland Ljóstengt running from 2016 to 2022. It funds FTTH deployment to 5,500 rural locations allowing this goal to be reached. As of 2021, only 216 locations remain that only have ADSL service (lower than 10Mb/s speed). The Government of Iceland's goal is for 99% of homes and businesses to have access to at least 100Mbit/s speeds by the year 2022.

Internet Service Providers 
The main providers as of 2018 are: Síminn, Vodafone Iceland, Nova and Hringdu.

The telecoms market in Iceland has become increasingly diversified over the past 20 years since the privatisation of the state telecom and postal administration, currently offering services as Síminn and Míla hf. Many new providers use Ljósleiðarinn's full fibre network to offer 3 play services of Internet, TV and phone services. Ljósleiðarinn is a wholesale access provider and merely runs the infrastructure of the FTTH network and charges a flat fee of 2.999kr (around US$30) per month to access the network. Internet services are then resold through telecommunications companies, the largest being Vodafone. Notably, Síminn refused to resell internet products through Ljósleiðarinn until as they operate their own network, Míla, which provides FTTC/VDSL2 services. In 2021, Síminn began to offer services over Ljósleiðrarinn's wholesale network.

The ISP market share as of 2018 is divided as follows:

Síminn: 46.6%

Vodafone: 33.6%

Nova: 9.7%

Hringdu: 7.7%

Others: 2.4%

International/Submarine connectivity
Iceland is currently connected with 4 submarine communications cable system to Europe and North America, as well as one currently under construction: Iceland has access total capacity of 168.2Tbit/s capacity as of 2021. According to Farice ehf., as of 2021, a total of 1.5Tb/s of capacity is currently being utilised for international bandwidth in Iceland.

Most of Iceland's growth in international bandwidth is due to data center investment in the country, the domestic internet market is fairly saturated.

Iceland's first fiber submarine cable providing packet switching, CANTAT-3, had an original capacity of 2 x 2.5 Gbit/s to Denmark, Germany, the Faroe Islands and Canada. It was notoriously unreliable, with an average of one cable cut per year. Satellite was the only backup at the time, until FARICE was built in 2003. CANTAT-3 became obsolete in 2010 with the introduction on DANICE and is now out of normal use for internet traffic in Iceland. CANTAT-3 is now operated by Føroya Tele for connecting oil platforms in the North Sea.

The main provider of international capacity to Europe is Farice ehf. with Tusass providing services to Greenland and North America.

The submarine cable capacities have been repeatedly upgraded over time as the demands of increased bandwidth use in Iceland, as end equipment technology has improved. Previously DANICE and FARICE operated with 300Gbit links and Greenland Connect with a 20Gbit link but were upgraded in 2014 to their current design capacity using coherent 100G wavelength and flex grid technology.

Farice ehf. completed construction of the IRIS cable system at the end of 2022, extending from Þorlákshöfn, Iceland to Galway, Ireland. IRIS was laid during the summer of 2022 and became ready for service on the 1st March 2023. It consists of 6 fiber pairs, with a design capacity of 108Tb/s, more than doubling Iceland's current subsea capacity. IRIS gives Iceland a latency of 10ms to Ireland and will also connect Iceland more directly with transatlantic capacity to the U.S. through Ireland.

International Latency 

As Iceland is geographically situated in the mid-atlantic, it has shorter ping times to locations to Europe than North America. Here are a few examples of nominal ping times from Iceland:

 Galway: 10ms (via IRIS)
 Glasgow: 13.0ms
 Copenhagen: 14.9ms
 London: 18.5ms
 Amsterdam: 17.8ms
 Budapest: 26.0ms
 New York: 40.6ms (via Greenland Connect)
 Halifax: 33.7ms (via Greenland Connect)

Domestic Backbone 

Iceland's domestic internet backbone is composed of many fibre routes, with microwave links serving the most isolated communities. Iceland's backbone is operated by two companies; Míla hf and Ljósleiðarinn (previously "Gagnaveita Reykjavíkur", majority owned by the City of Reykjavík) Other companies also operate their own backbone networks, such as Orkufjarskipti (owned by electricity utilities Landsvirkjun and Landsnet).

The most historically critical part of Iceland's internet infrastructure is a fibre ring that circles the country, roughly following the route of Iceland's ring road (Route 1), passing through most towns and cities. It is still an important part of Iceland's internet backbone, but has been duplicated on most routes by private companies. It was constructed in 1989-1991 by the Icelandic Government and NATO to link radar stations of the Iceland Air Defence System. It consists of 8 fibres, 1 of which are for use by NATO, 5 by Míla hf (previously owned by Síminn) and 2 leased to Ljósleiðarinn.

Prior to 2022, two pairs were used by NATO and one by Vodafone Iceland. To increase competition in the telecom industry, one of the NATO pairs was leased out by competitive tender, which Ljósleiðarinn won. In their aim to expand their network beyond the southwest into a national network, Ljósleiðarinn took over Vodafone Iceland's national backbone as well as their 1 pair on the NATO fibre ring, giving them 2 pairs to utilise on the national ring. They plan to lay their own circular route around Iceland in the next few years. This means Vodafone Iceland no longer operates its own backbone.

National Educational and Research Network 
Universities and research institutions are connected by RHnet, Iceland's national eductation and research network (NERN). It is connected to the wider Nordic educational network, NORDUnet and European educational network, GÉANT. The origins of Iceland's internet stem from this network through Hafrannsóknastofnun and in turn the University of Iceland, first being connected in 1986.

Use 
Internet access is widespread in Iceland and there has been rapid growth in use since the early 2000s. Data compiled by the Organisation for Economic Co-operation and Development (OECD) shows Iceland with:
 98.2% of households having broadband Internet access in 2016 (1st out of 34)
 99.5% of businesses using the Internet in 2009-2010 (2nd out of 31)
The Global Information Technology Report 2010–2011 by the World Economic Forum ranked Iceland:
 1st out of 138 in terms of Internet users (93.5% of the population used the Internet in 2009)
 1st out of 138 in the use of virtual social networks (a score of 6.8 in 2009–2010, where 1 is not at all and 7 is widely)
 1st out of 138 in terms of Internet access in schools (a score of 6.76 in 2009–2010, where 1 is very limited and 7 is extensive)
 1st out of 138 in accessibility of digital content (a score of 6.62 in 2009–2010, where 1 is not accessible at all and 7 is widely accessible)
 1st out of 137 in the number of secure Internet servers (1,711.3 servers per million population in 2009)
 4th out of 138 in the extent of business Internet use (a score of 6.58 in 2009–2010, where 1 is not at all and 7 is extensively)
 5th out of 138 in terms of international Internet bandwidth (626.8 Mbit/s per 10,000 population in 2009)
 12th out of 138 in terms of laws related to information and communication technology (a score of 5.46 in 2009–2010, where 1 is nonexistent and 7 is well developed)
 25th out of 138 in terms of intellectual property protection (a score of 5.09 in 2009–2010, where 1 is very weak and 7 is very strong)
 35th out of 107 in the use of unlicensed software (an estimated 49% of software was unlicensed in 2009)
 45th out of 138 in terms of freedom of the press (a score of 5.76 in 2009–2010, where 1 is totally restricted and 7 is completely free)

History

Iceland's first connection to the internet was in 1986 through Hafrannsóknastofnun to Amsterdam, eventually expanding to the University of Iceland and eventually becoming ISnet (now Internet á Íslandi hf)., which in turn became ISNIC, the manager of the ".is" domain. The development of Iceland's internet per ISnet, are listed in the table below:

 In 1986 Iceland obtained a UUCP connection between the Marine Research Institute in Iceland to EUnet (European Unix Network) headquarters in Amsterdam.  The connection provided e-mail and Usenet services. Bandwidth was somewhere between 300 and 1200 bits per second (bps).
 In 1989 a connection to the Internet was established using IP over X.25 with NORDUnet in Denmark at 2400 bit/s.
 In 1990 a leased line connection to NORDUnet in Stockholm operating at 9600 bit/s was established.  This link was upgraded to operate at 56,000 bit/s in 1992, 128,000 bit/s in 1994, 256,000 bit/s and then 1,000,000 bit/s in 1995, and 1,984,000 in 1996.
 In 1991 the NATO fibre ring was completed, serving as an important part of Iceland's domestic telecom/internet backbone.
 In 1994 the first commercial Internet services, Midheimar ehf, opened with SLIP/PPP access giving people access to the web for the first time from their homes.
 In March 1997 ISnet (a collective term for the Icelandic segments of NORDUnet and EUnet) established a direct connection to Teleglobe in Montreal, Canada at 9600 bit/s. to supplement the European connection. This line was moved to New York City and upgraded to 48,178,001 bit/s in September 1999.
1999 marked the first year ADSL services were available in Iceland.
In January 2004 the submarine communications fibre cable system FARICE-1 was put into commercial operation with a design capacity of 720 Gbit/s and lit capacity of 20 Gbit/s (and in August 2013 upgraded to a design capacity of 11 Tbit/s and a lit capacity of 200 Gbit/s).
2004 FTTH trials began of Orkuveita Reykjavíkur building a fibre optic network, operating through a subsidiary called Gagnveita Reykjavíkur (GR) with a 100Mbit/s connection.
In 2007, Seltjarnarnes became the world's first town where every citizen had access to fiber optics. 
In 2008, xDSL use peaked in Iceland with 98% of connections.
 In September 2009 the submarine communications fibre cable DANICE was put into commercial operation with an original design capacity of 5120 Gbit/s (and later upgraded to a design capacity of at least 16 Terabit/s and a lit capacity of 200 Gbit/s). Additionally Greenland Connect as third cable was installed at the same time.
From 2009, VDSL services became active from Míla in Reykjavík and larger towns offering 50-100Mbit/s services.
In October 2016, Ljósleiðarinn (Gagnveita Reykjavíkur) upgraded its network from 100Mbit to 1Gbit/s symmetric connections to all customers.
In 2018, full fibre connections surpassed xDSL use for the first time.
2018 marked the year that 100% of homes in the Reykjavík area had FTTH access.
In March 2023, the IRIS submarine cable system was completed, more than doubling Iceland's international bandwidth capacity with a new route to Ireland.

Censorship

Censorship is prohibited by the Icelandic Constitution and there is a strong tradition of protecting freedom of expression that extends to the use of the Internet. However, questions about how best to protect children, fight terrorism, prevent libel, and protect the rights of copyright holders are ongoing in Iceland as they are in much of the world.

The five Nordic countries—Denmark, Finland, Norway, Sweden, and Iceland—are central players in the European battle between file sharers, rights holders, and Internet service providers (ISPs). While each country determines its own destiny, the presence of the European Union (EU) is felt in all legal controversies and court cases. Iceland, while not a member of the EU, is part of the European Economic Area (EEA) and has agreed to enact legislation similar to that passed in the EU in areas such as consumer protection and business law.

Internet service providers in Iceland use filters to block Web sites distributing child pornography. Iceland's ISPs in cooperation with Barnaheill—Save the Children Iceland participate in the International Association of Internet Hotlines (INHOPE) project. Suspicious links are reported by organizations and the general public and passed on to relevant authorities for verification.

In 2012 and 2013 Ögmundur Jónasson, Minister of Interior, proposed two bills to the Icelandic parliament that would limit Icelander's access to the Internet. The first proposed limitations on gambling and the second on pornography. Neither bill was passed by the Icelandic parliament and a new government has since been formed following the parliamentary election held on 27 April 2013.

History 

On 10 June 2009 the two major ISPs in Iceland, Vodafone Iceland and Iceland Telecom at the behest of SAFT (Save the Children Iceland) and other interest groups instated a null route on the website ringulreid.org, making it inaccessible to most commercial Internet users in Iceland. Other members of the Reykjavik Internet Exchange did not institute the null route, but both Vodafone and Síminn blocked it at their Icelandic routers.

The ringulreid.org domain subsequently expired and the site was taken down by its operator. But a similar site slembingur.org sprang up to replace it.

Both Vodafone Iceland and Síminn updated their blocks to null route 83.99.152.251, the IP address slembingur.org resolves to.
ringulreid.org was a 4chan-like image board in the Icelandic language which had been making the news for cyber-bullying, child porn and similar material. The administrators of the site had rejected these accusations, citing their strict policies of banning users who posted child pornography. ringulreid.org had been set up after a similar site, handahof.org, had been voluntarily closed down by its operator on request of the Iceland Capital Police following their investigation into the matter.

The block against ringulreid.org was instated at the behest of the National Police of Iceland, Iceland Capital Police, the Child Protection Authority of Iceland (part of the Iceland Ministry of Social Affairs), Save the Children Iceland (SAFT) (a private organization) and various other private and government groups, which made public statements encouraging all internet service providers in the country to block access to the site.

Thus the censorship in Iceland is not explicitly government mandated, but implemented voluntarily by private corporations in response to pressure from government and private institutions. Vodafone conducted a legal review to investigate whether it was within its rights to restrict access to the website, and after finding that they were within their rights instituted the block.

In a statement two days after the initial block Hrannar Pétursson, the press secretary for Vodafone, indicated that it was not on Vodafone's agenda to implement a more general censoring mechanism, but as ringulreid.org was an "exaggerated example of such a case" Vodafone considered the act justifiable. His colleague Margrét Stefánsdóttir at Síminn echoed those remarks, saying that Síminn would never close a page on its own initiative, but when faced with such serious requests they were compelled to act.

Since slembingur.org is hosted on a shared web hosting service, and the block takes the form of a null route any other sites that happen to share the same IP address are also blocked. As of 30 September 2010 these were the private E-Mail gateway ns1.bighost.lv, the cosmetics manufacturer saulesfabrika.com, the construction company timbersolution.com, the printing house veiters.com and the boilerplate site ventus.lv. As of 8 February 2011, slembingur.org had changed IP addresses and is therefore no longer blocked by Vodafone. The null route is still in place, so collateral damage is the only result from this incident.

See also
 Telecommunications in Iceland
 .is domain
 Reykjavik Internet Exchange (RIX)
 CANTAT-3
 FARICE
 DANICE
 Greenland Connect
 Verne Global
 Síminn
 Vodafone Iceland (Sýn)
 Internet censorship by country

References